Pulayanarkotta is a locality in Thiruvananthapuram, Kerala, India. The Southern Air Command is based at Pulayarnarkotta.

Meaning of the name
Pulayanarkotta literally means the fort of the Pulaya's King.

History
The Pulayanarkotta region was a region near Trivandrum and said to be related to the head of Pulaya community. A temple dedicated to Kalipulayan is at Attakulangara in Thiruvananthapuram.

Organisations based in Pulayanarkotta
The Government Indian Institute of Diabetes center

The Government T.B Centre and Chest Diseases Hospital  .

Southern Air Command (India).

Religious institutions
Kunjuveedu Kovil
Kunnam Siva Temple
Idiyadikkodu Bhagavathi Temple
Peadikkadu Pangiyamma Bhagavathi Temple Trust
Sree Bhagavathikkavu Devi Temple
Juma Masjid
Moosa Moulana Guidance Centre Masjid
Kumarapuram Juma Masjid

See also
Ulloor
Kazhakoottam
Attakulangara

References

Suburbs of Thiruvananthapuram
Thiruvananthapuram